Grand Central Park (also known as The EpicCentral) is an American property in Grand Prairie, Texas.  The establishment consists of "The Summit", "The Epic", "Epic Waters" and "PlayGrand Adventures".

The Summit 
The Summit is a fitness facility designed for people over 50 years of age.

Epic Waters 
Epic Waters is an indoor water park with a retractable roof.

PlayGrand Adventures 

PlayGrand Adventures is simply the modern playground

References 

Water parks in Texas